Didier Daeninckx (born 27 April 1949 in Saint-Denis, Seine-Saint-Denis) is a French author and left-wing politician of Belgian descent, best known for his romans noirs.

Works translated into English
 (Meurtres pour mémoire) by Melville House Publishing
A Very Profitable War (Le Der des ders) by Melville House Publishing

See also 

 Prix Goncourt de la Nouvelle

References

1949 births
Living people
People from Saint-Denis, Seine-Saint-Denis
20th-century French novelists
20th-century French male writers
21st-century French novelists
French male short story writers
French short story writers
French crime fiction writers
French male novelists
Prix Louis Guilloux winners
Prix Goncourt de la nouvelle recipients
Chevaliers of the Ordre des Arts et des Lettres
Anarcho-communists
French anarchists
21st-century French male writers